The Pium River is a river of Tocantins state in central Brazil.

See also
List of rivers of Tocantins

References
Brazilian Ministry of Transport

Rivers of Tocantins